Bispira is a genus of marine bristleworm in the family Sabellidae. Its members were initially included in genus Sabella by Grube in 1851. In 1856, Krøyer described Bispira as a separate genus. Members of Bispira are defined by spirally-coiled, equally-divided branchial lobes.

Species 
According to the World Register of Marine Species, Bispira contains 31 valid species:

 Bispira brunnea (Treadwell, 1917) 
 Bispira crassicornis (Sars, 1851) 
 Bispira elegans (Bush, 1905) 
 Bispira fabricii (Krøyer, 1856) 
 Bispira guinensis (Augener, 1918) 
 Bispira klautae Costa-Paiva & Paiva, 2007
 Bispira manicata (Grube, 1878) 
 Bispira mariae Lo Bianco, 1893
 Bispira melanostigma (Schmarda, 1861) 
 Bispira monroi (Hartman, 1961) 
 Bispira oatesiana (Benham, 1927) 
 Bispira pacifica (Berkeley & Berkeley, 1954) 
 Bispira paraporifera Tovar-Hernandez & Salazar-Vallejo, 2006
 Bispira polyomma Giangrande & Faasse, 2012
 Bispira porifera (Grube, 1878) 
 Bispira primaoculata Cepeda & Lattig, 2017
 Bispira secusolutus (Hoagland, 1920) 
 Bispira serrata Capa, 2007
 Bispira spirobranchia (Zachs, 1933) 
 Bispira tricyclia (Schmarda, 1861) 
 Bispira turneri Hartman, 1969
 Bispira viola (Grube, 1863) 
 Bispira volutacornis (Montagu, 1804) 
 Bispira wireni (Johansson, 1922)

References

Sabellida